La Bresse is a commune in the Vosges department in Grand Est in northeastern France. The area is known for its ski resorts and outdoor activities.

La Bresse is located about 45 km west of Colmar and 55 km north west of Mulhouse in the valley of the Moselotte river within the Vosges regional park.

See also
Communes of the Vosges department
 Hohneck
 Kastelberg

References

External links

 Official website

Communes of Vosges (department)
Vosges communes articles needing translation from French Wikipedia